Louis Charles Armand Fouquet, known as Chevalier de Belle-Isle, (19 September 1693 in Agde – 19 July 1747 at the Battle of Assietta) was a French general and diplomat. He was the younger brother to Marshal Charles Louis Auguste Fouquet, duc de Belle-Isle.

He served as a junior officer in the War of the Spanish Succession and as brigadier in the campaign of 1734 on the Rhine and Moselle, where he won the grade of Maréchal de camp. He was employed under his brother in political missions in Bavaria and in Swabia in 1741–1742, became a lieutenant-general, fought in Bohemia, Bavaria and the Rhine countries in 1742–1743, and was arrested and sent to England with the marshal in 1744. On his release he was given a command in the Army of Piedmont, and troops under his command reinforced the beleaguered city of Antibes during the 1746-7 siege, preventing its fall to the Austrians. Belle-Isle ultimately was killed at the Battle of Assietta on 19 July 1747.

Notes

References

1693 births
1747 deaths
People from Agde
French lieutenant generals
18th-century French diplomats
French military personnel of the War of the Spanish Succession
French military personnel of the War of the Austrian Succession
French military personnel killed in action
Knights of the Order of Saint Louis